Where I Wanna Be is the fifth studio album by English-Irish country singer Nathan Carter. It was released in Ireland on 26 August 2013 by Decca Records and Sharpe Music. The album peaked at number 1 on the Irish Albums Chart. The album includes the singles "Where I Wanna Be" and "Boys of Summer".

Singles
"Where I Wanna Be" was released as the lead single from the album. "Boys of Summer" was released as the second single from the album. The song peaked at number 96 on the Irish Singles Chart.

Track listing

Charts

Release history

References

2013 albums
Nathan Carter albums